Russell Creek was a short creek,  long, that flowed through what is now downtown Toronto, Ontario, Canada, west of the original town of York. The creek was named for Peter Russell and flowed generally southeast, like all the other waterways in Toronto, reflecting the recent glaciation, into Toronto Harbour near the present CN Tower. The creek was buried in 1876, but traces of it can still be found, for instance on the grounds of the historic Grange mansion.

The Spadina Brewery was built on its banks, in 1837, and used its waters.

See also
 List of Ontario rivers

References

Rivers of Toronto